Princess Cruises is an American cruise line owned by Carnival Corporation & plc. The company is incorporated in Bermuda and its headquarters are in Santa Clarita, California. As of 2021, it is the second largest cruise line by net revenue. It was previously a subsidiary of P&O Princess Cruises, and is currently under the Holland America Group within Carnival Corporation & plc, which holds executive control over the Princess Cruises brand. The line has 15 ships cruising global itineraries that are marketed to both American and international passengers.

In the 1980s, Princess rose in prominence after American television series The Love Boat was set primarily on the Pacific Princess in its weekly episodes, and the brand has since continued to invoke its connection to the series.

History

Early years: 1965–1974 
Princess Cruises began in 1965, when founder Stanley McDonald chartered Canadian Pacific Limited's Alaska cruise ship Princess Patricia for Mexican Riviera cruises from Los Angeles during a time when she would have usually been laid up for the winter.  However, Princess Pat, as she was fondly called, had never been designed for tropical cruising, lacking air-conditioning, and Princess ended her charter in favor of a more purpose-built cruise ship Italia.

Princess, who marketed the ship as Princess Italia, but never officially renamed her, used the ship to inaugurate their Mexican Riviera cruises out of Los Angeles and did not receive the Princess logo on her funnel until 1967.

In 1969, Princess Italia was used on Alaskan cruises from San Francisco, but by 1973, the charter was canceled, and Italia returned to Europe on charter to Costa Cruise Line.

Princess's third charter ship was none other than Costa's Carla C. Originally, Compagnie Générale Transatlantique's SS Flandre, the ship had been purchased by Costa in the late 1960s and given a major rebuilding.  Almost immediately after completion, the ship was chartered to Princess, and it was on board the ship, which was marketed as, but again not officially renamed, Princess Carla, that Jeraldine Saunders wrote the first chapters of her nonfiction book The Love Boats.

As subsidiary of P&O: 1974–2000 
Britain's Peninsular & Oriental Steam Navigation Company (P&O), which by 1960 was the world's largest shipping company, with 320 oceangoing vessels, acquired Princess Cruise Lines in 1974 and their Spirit of London (originally to have been Norwegian Cruise Line's Seaward) was transferred to the Princess fleet, becoming the first Sun Princess.

The two ships that were to be featured heavily in the television series The Love Boat were built in 1971 at Nordseewerke for Flagship Cruises and originally named the Sea Venture (for the original Sea Venture, the 1609 wreck of which resulted in the settlement of Bermuda) and Island Venture. In 1974, P&O purchased them for their Princess division, and they served as Island Princess and Pacific Princess respectively.

A part-time addition to the Princess fleet was the former Swedish transatlantic liner Kungsholm, purchased by P&O from Flagship Cruises in 1978, and then restyled and rebuilt in Bremen as Sea Princess. She was initially based in Australia as a P&O ship until 1981 when her role there was taken over by Oriana. After that, she alternated between P&O and Princess colours as she moved between fleets. Sea Princess returned to the P&O UK fleet permanently and in 1995 and was renamed MV Victoria to allow a then-new Princess ship to be named Sea Princess.

In 1981, Princess began calling at the cruise line's first private Caribbean destination, Palm Island in the Grenadines.

The first P&O Princess Cruises purpose-built cruise ship was Royal Princess, christened by Princess Diana in 1984, she was the largest new British passenger ship in a decade, and one of the first, if not the first, ships to completely dispense with interior cabins. The ship served in P&O Cruises fleet as Artemis until 2011.

In 1986, P&O Princess Cruises acquired Tour Alaska, which operated on the Alaska Railroad. Based in Anchorage, Alaska, Princess Tours now operates ten luxury railcars with full-service scenic tours of Denali (formerly Mount McKinley) and can accommodate over 700 passengers per day. That same year, Princess unveiled Princess Bay, located at Saline Bay on the Caribbean island of Mayreau. Princess Bay was the cruise line's second private island resort, replacing Palm Island, and was marketed as "every castaway's first choice," primarily featured on the cruise line's Caribbean itineraries from San Juan, Puerto Rico, but is now no longer a Princess private resort.

Sitmar Cruises acquisition, fleet expansion 

P&O Princess Cruises acquired Sitmar Line in 1988 and transferred all of its major tonnage to Princess, including three cruise ships then under construction. Dawn Princess and Fair Princess were both ex-Cunard, and the former Sitmar Fairsky became Princess's Sky Princess. The first of the three new Sitmar ships came into the Princess brand in 1989 as Star Princess, the largest British exclusively cruising ship. Two 70,000 GT cruise ships designed originally by famed architect Renzo Piano entered service in 1990 as Crown Princess and Regal Princess, bringing Princess's fleet up to ten deluxe cruise ships. This greatly enlarged the Princess fleet by eventually adding six ships, making it a major competitor with the other Caribbean cruise lines.

Princess Cays 

In 1991, Princess Cruises began developing their third ever Caribbean private resort named Princess Cays located on the southern tip of the island of Eleuthera in the Bahamas. The development was reported to cost $1.2 million and was unveiled in 1992, becoming an exclusive port of call for the cruise line's Western Caribbean itineraries. The private destination is also shared between sister brands, Carnival Cruise Line and Holland America Line. The resort suffered from a fire in January 2019 that damaged several buildings along the south side of the island.

Fleet modernization: Sun-class 

In the early 1990s, Princess was operating a fleet of mostly second-hand ships, with the majority having been inherited from the Sitmar Cruises acquisition. The last purpose-built Princess new build had been the Royal Princess in 1984, and the 3 recent inherited new builds had all been designed for Sitmar Cruises. A new building project was commenced with the first new build debuting in 1995 with the Sun Princess. This was the first of four ships in the class, followed by the Dawn Princess, Sea Princess, and Ocean Princess. At the same time Princess began transferring some of its older ships to parent company P&O Cruises and their subsidiaries P&O Australia. The Dawn Princess  left the fleet in 1993, Sea Princess in 1995, Golden Princess, 1996, Fair Princess in 1997, Island Princess in 1999.

Grand-class introduction 

Princess unveiled its first Grand-class vessel in 1998, the Grand Princess, which debuted on May 26, and was christened by Olivia de Havilland. At the time, the $450 million Fincantieri-built vessel was the largest passenger ship ever commissioned and completed. Two more ships in the class, Golden Princess and Star Princess, followed, pioneering the design that carried on through the following six vessels in the class, with the last ship delivered in 2008.

As subsidiary of P&O Princess Cruises: 2000–2003 
On October 23, 2000, the Peninsular & Oriental Steam Navigation Company (P&O) spun-off its passenger division to form an independent company, P&O Princess Cruises. In 2001, Princess Cruises headquarters moved from Century City to Santa Clarita, near the Westfield Valencia Town Center.

With the debut of Golden Princess in North America in 2001, Sky Princess was deployed to Australia for P&O Cruises Australia in 2000 and replace Fair Princess. Sky Princess was transformed into Pacific Sky to become the sister brand's first modern-era cruise ship for the recently spun off P&O Cruises Australia. Star Princess commenced operations in March 2002 and became the first "mega-ship" to operate from the West Coast on a full-time basis. In June 2002, Crown Princess was transferred to P&O Princess' new start-up brand, A'Rosa Cruises, to be the only cruise ship in A'Rosa's fleet to help launch the brand.

In 2002 the Pacific Princess, famous as the ship from The Love Boat, left the Princess fleet after 27 years of service with the line, and last of the original Princess fleet.

Coral-class introduction 

In 2002 and 2003 Princess debuted two panamax ships, the Coral Princess and Island Princess. Built to be the maximized sized ships to transit the Panama Canal, they were assigned for longer Southern Caribbean and Panama Canal cruises. They would also incorporate the ship engineering trend of the time of having additional Gas-Turbine Engines. This was emphasized in the ships design with giant decorative faux turbines on each side of the funnel.

R-class ships acquisition 

Princess eventually acquired two former Renaissance ships for the line starting in 2002. They were be deployed for longer and more exotic destination cruises. The ships joining the fleet were Tahitian Princess, which was first based in Tahiti before being later renamed Ocean Princess, and Pacific Princess, reviving the famous name of the ship featured on The Love Boat.

As subsidiary of Carnival Corporation & plc: 2003–present 
P&O Princess Cruises merged with Carnival Corporation on April 17, 2003, to form the world's largest cruise operating company in a deal worth US$5.4 billion. As a result of the merger, Carnival Corporation and P&O Princess were integrated to form Carnival Corporation & plc, with a portfolio of eleven cruise ship brands. It is a dual-listed company, registered in both the United States and the United Kingdom, with the former P&O Princess Cruises being relisted as Carnival plc, more commonly known as Carnival UK, which holds executive control over Cunard Line and P&O Cruises. As an American-based company, executive control of Princess Cruises was transferred to Carnival's American operations, with the formation of the Holland America Group umbrella, which comprises Princess, Holland America Line, Seabourn Cruise Line, and P&O Cruises Australia.

In 2005, the Royal Princess, Princess Cruises first purpose-built ship, was transferred to P&O Cruises after 21 years of service with the line.

In May 2005, Princess reacquired Sea Princess from P&O, which it had transferred over just two years prior.

On April 3, 2008, Micky Arison, the chairman of Carnival Corporation & plc, stated that due to the low value of the United States dollar because of the recession, inflation and high shipbuilding costs, the company would not be ordering any new ships for their U.S.-based brands (Princess, Carnival Cruise Line, and Holland America Line) before the economic situation improved.

Royal-class introduction 

In May 2010, Carnival Corporation & plc signed a contract with Fincantieri for the construction of two new 3,600-passenger ships, known as the Royal-class cruise ships, for Princess Cruises. The Royal-class vessels are the largest ships ever constructed for Princess. Royal Princess, Princess' new flagship vessel, entered service in 2013. In 2017, Princess further invested in China via the delivery of their third Royal-class ship, Majestic Princess, after it was designed to accommodate the Chinese-speaking market and scheduled to homeport in Shanghai. Following the delivery of Sky Princess in October 2019, Princess received two more Royal-class ships to complete the class with six vessels.

Sphere-class introduction, LNG debut 

In July 2018, Princess signed a memorandum of agreement with Fincantieri for the construction of two new 175,000 GT ships that will be primarily powered by liquefied natural gas (LNG). The ships will become the largest vessels built in Italy and commissioned for Princess as well as the first in the fleet to run on LNG. The final contract was signed in March 2019, ushering in the development of the ships. Princess will become the fifth Carnival Corporation brand to operate ships running on LNG upon the first ship's delivery in late-2023.

In 2020, Princess parted ways with a Grand-class ship, Golden Princess, for the first time, after she was transferred to P&O Cruises Australia; she joined their fleet in October 2020. Star Princess became the second Grand-class ship to exit after she was also transferred to P&O in November 2021. In September 2020, Princess sold both remaining two ships of the Sun-class. Sun Princess was acquired by Peace Boat and renamed Pacific World; Sea Princess was sold to Chinese start-up Sanya International Cruise Development and renamed MS Charming.

Current fleet

Future fleet

Former fleet

Incidents 
Princess Cruises was involved in litigation with General Electric in 1998 over consequential damages and lost profits resulting from a contract the two parties entered into. General Electric was to provide inspection and repair services upon the SS Sky Princess. Upon noticing surface rust on the turbine rotor, the vessel was brought ashore for cleaning and balancing, but good metal was unintentionally removed. This destabilized the rotor, forcing Princess Cruises to cancel two 10-day cruises while additional work was performed. Princess originally prevailed, being awarded nearly $4.6 million. On appeal, however, the judgement was reversed in favor of General Electric, and Princess Cruises only recovered the price of the contract, less than $232,000.

Ocean pollution 
On August 26, 2013, the crew of Caribbean Princess deliberately discharged 4,227gallons of oil-contaminated waste off the southern coast of England. The discharge involved the illegal modification of the vessel's on-board pollution control systems, and was photographed by a newly hired engineer. When the ship subsequently berthed at Southampton, the engineer resigned his position and reported the discharge to the UK Maritime and Coastguard Agency. An investigation launched by the U.S. Department of Justice Environment and Natural Resources Division (ENRD) found that the practice had been taking place on Caribbean Princess and four other Princess ships – Star Princess, Grand Princess, Coral Princess, and Golden Princess – since 2005.

In December 2016, Princess agreed to plead guilty to seven felony charges and pay a $40 million penalty. The charges related to illegal discharges off the coasts of Florida, Maine, Massachusetts, New Jersey, New York, Rhode Island, South Carolina, Texas, Virginia, the U.S. Virgin Islands and Puerto Rico. As part of the agreement, cruise ships from eight Carnival companies, including Carnival Cruise Line and Holland America Line, are required to operate for five years under a court-supervised environmental compliance plan with independent audits and a court-appointed monitor. The fine was the "largest-ever criminal penalty involving deliberate vessel pollution."

For violation of the probation terms of 2016, Carnival Corporation and Princess were ordered to pay an additional $20 million penalty in 2019. The new violations included discharging plastic into waters in the Bahamas, falsifying records, and interfering with court supervision.

2019–2021 COVID-19 pandemic 

During the COVID-19 pandemic, several ships from the cruise line became major clusters of infection of the disease, including Diamond Princess and Ruby Princess, spreading it around the world. By February, 712 cases had developed on Diamond Princess, of which 11 eventually died. This drew worldwide attention and led to several countries repatriating their citizens from the ship. Shortly before the disease was declared a pandemic, and with over 2700 passengers on board, Ruby Princess sailed into international waters despite a global increase of confirmed cases of COVID-19. By mid April, there were 852 confirmed cases among Australian passengers alone, and 21 deaths. The subsequent discharge of infected passengers into Australia worsened the national pandemic in the country and caused a humanitarian crisis.
Other related incidents:

 Sun Princess was not allowed to dock at a port in Madagascar on 13 February 2020 as it had visited Thailand, where there were cases of SARS-CoV-2, less than 14 days before. The ship docked at Réunion on 1 March, but passengers were met by a crowd of about 30 people who insisted that the passengers must be inspected for SARS-CoV-2, and tried to prevent them from leaving the port area. Missiles were thrown at passengers, and the police deployed tear gas.
 A crew member on Grand Princess had transferred to Royal Princess fifteen days before, the CDC issued a "no-sail order" on 8 March 2020, due to COVID-19 infections, prompting Princess Cruises to cancel the ship's seven-day cruise to Mexico before it departed Los Angeles.
 On 7 March, Regal Princess tested two crewmembers for SARS-CoV-2, and delayed docking at Port Everglades for almost a day while waiting for test results to come back.
 A passenger on board contracted COVID-19 on the cruise and died, resulting in the ship being quarantined off the coast of San Francisco because of further infections.
 On 20 March 2020, it was announced that three passengers and a crew member of Ruby Princess had tested positive for COVID-19. The ship had docked in Sydney Harbour, and the passengers had disembarked before the results came back positive.  The ship had returned to Sydney with 1,100 crew members and 2,700 passengers, and 13 people that were sick were tested for the virus. On April 5, 2020, the New South Wales Police Force announced they had launched a criminal investigation into whether the operator of the Ruby Princess downplayed potential coronavirus cases before thousands of passengers disembarked in Sydney.
On 6 January 2021, Princess Cruises announced that it will cancel cruises through 14 May 2021.

The vast majority of all cruise lines's sailings were under suspension in late 2020. As of 6 January 2021, all Princess sailings were cancelled to at least 14 May 2021, according to an industry news item.

References

External links

 
1965 establishments in California
American companies established in 1965
Carnival Corporation & plc
Companies based in Los Angeles County, California
Companies formerly listed on the London Stock Exchange
Cruise lines
Santa Clarita, California
Transport companies established in 1965